The royal supporters of England are the heraldic supporter creatures appearing on each side of the royal arms of England. The royal supporters of the monarchs of England displayed a variety, or even a menagerie, of real and imaginary heraldic beasts, either side of their royal arms of sovereignty, including lion, leopard, panther and tiger, antelope and hart, greyhound, boar and bull, falcon, cock, eagle and swan, red and gold dragons, as well as the current unicorn.

Heraldic supporters of the monarchs of England

See also
The Lion and the Unicorn
The Queen's Beasts

References
Citations

Bibliography

See also

 Royal Standards of England
 Royal Badges of England
 Royal Arms of England
 Royal coat of arms of the United Kingdom
 Heraldry

 
National symbols of England
England
English heraldry